The Golden Compass is a 2007 fantasy adventure film directed by Chris Weitz, from a screenplay by Weitz, and based on the 1995 novel Northern Lights by Philip Pullman, the first installment in Pullman's His Dark Materials trilogy. It stars Dakota Blue Richards as Lyra Belacqua, Nicole Kidman as Marisa Coulter, and Daniel Craig as Lord Asriel, alongside Sam Elliott, Ian McKellen, and Eva Green. In the film, Lyra joins a tribe of seafarers on a trip to the far North in search of children kidnapped by the Gobblers, a group supported by the universe's rulers, the Magisterium.

Development on the film was first announced in February 2002, but difficulties over the screenplay and the selection of a director (including Weitz departing and returning) caused significant delays. Richards was cast as Lyra in June 2006, with Kidman and Craig joining soon thereafter. Principal photography began that September and lasted for several months, with filming locations including Shepperton Studios and also on location throughout England, Switzerland, and Norway. With a production budget of US$180 million, it is one of New Line Cinema's most expensive films, and prior to release, the film faced criticism from secularist and religious organisations due to the source material's anti-religious themes, which caused several changes to the film in post-production.

The Golden Compass premiered in London on November 27, 2007, and was theatrically released in the United Kingdom by Entertainment Film on December 5 and in the United States by New Line on December 7. The film received mixed reviews from critics, with praise for the casting and visual effects, but criticism for its pacing, characterization, and screenplay, drawing unfavorable comparisons to Pullman's novel. The Golden Compass has grossed $372 million worldwide but was a box office disappointment in North America which directly contributed to New Line Cinema's 2008 restructuring. The film won for Best Visual Effects at the 80th Academy Awards and for Best Special Visual Effects at the 61st British Academy Film Awards.

Plot
On an alternate retrofuturistic Earth ruled by the Magisterium, every person's soul exists outside the body as an animal companion, a dæmon.

Lyra Belacqua is an orphan raised at Jordan College in Oxford with her dæmon Pantalaimon or "Pan". Her uncle Lord Asriel returns from seeking the elusive Dust, a cosmic particle the Magisterium forbids to be mentioned. Lyra saves him from wine poisoned by a Magisterium agent, and Asriel presents his discovery that Dust at the North Pole links to infinite worlds. He is granted another expedition though his theory, if proven, could undermine the Magisterium's control.

Mrs. Coulter, a wealthy "friend" of the college, invites Lyra to stay with her in London. The Master of the college entrusts Lyra with her uncle's alethiometer, a compass-like artefact that reveals the truth, warning her to keep it secret. Kidnappers called "Gobblers" have been abducting children, including Lyra's friend Roger and Billy Costa, a young Gyptian. Lyra discovers Mrs. Coulter is head of the General Oblation Board, realising they are the Gobblers, and she and Pan escape when Mrs. Coulter's dæmon attempts to steal the alethiometer.

Lyra is saved from Gobblers by Ma Costa, Billy's mother, and taken to the Gyptian king John Faa, who is sailing north to search for the children. Gyptian elder Farder Coram recognizes the alethiometer, which Lyra discovers she can decipher. In league with the Magisterium, Mrs. Coulter sends mechanical spy-flies after Lyra, but one is caught by Farder Coram. Asriel reaches Svalbard, the kingdom of the Ice Bears, but is captured by Samoyed tribesmen hired by Mrs. Coulter.

The witch queen Serafina Pekkala tells Lyra the children are at Bolvangar, and Lyra befriends Texan aeronaut Lee Scoresby, who suggests she hire him and his friend Iorek Byrnison, an armoured bear he has come to rescue. Once a prince of the bears, Iorek was defeated and exiled, and the townspeople have tricked him out of his armour. Lyra uses the alethiometer to help Iorek recover his armour, and he and Scoresby join the Gyptian trek northward.

Lyra, astride Iorek, follows the alethiometer and finds Billy, whom the Gobblers have experimented on using "intercision", a procedure that surgically separates him from his dæmon. The Gyptians are attacked by Samoyeds who capture Lyra, with Iorek and Lee in pursuit in Lee's airship. Lyra is taken to the bear king Ragnar Sturlusson, and tricks him into fighting Iorek himself. Ragnar, who poisoned Iorek's father, has the upper hand until Iorek feigns weakness and kills him, reclaiming the throne.

Iorek carries Lyra to Bolvangar, but she is forced to cross a narrow ice bridge alone before it collapses. Reaching the experimental station, Lyra reunites with Roger, and overhears Mrs. Coulter say that Asriel will soon be arrested for heresy. Caught by the scientists, Lyra and Pan are thrown into the intercision chamber but rescued by Mrs. Coulter. Explaining that the Magisterium believe intercision protects children from Dust's corrupting influence, Mrs. Coulter admits she is Lyra's mother, and Lyra realises Asriel is her father. Mrs. Coulter asks for the alethiometer, but Lyra gives her the can containing the spy-fly, which tranquilizes Mrs. Coulter unconscious.

Destroying the intercision machine, Lyra leads the children outside. They are confronted by Tatar mercenaries, who are defeated by Iorek, Scoresby, the Gyptians, and flying witches led by Serafina. With the children safe, Lyra, Roger, Iorek, Lee, and Serafina fly north to search for Asriel. Confirming Serafina's prophecy of a coming war with Lyra at its centre, Lyra is determined to fight the Magisterium, who plot to control all other worlds in the universe.

Cast

 Dakota Blue Richards as Lyra Belacqua, who embarks on a voyage to battle the forces of evil and rescue her best friend. New Line Cinema announced 11-year-old Richards' casting in June 2006. It was her first acting role.
 Nicole Kidman as Mrs. Coulter, an influential woman who takes an interest in Lyra (and later admits that she is Lyra's mother). Kidman was author Philip Pullman's preferred choice for the role ten years before production of the film, and despite initially rejecting the offer to star as she did not want to play a villain, she signed on after receiving a personal letter from Pullman.
 Daniel Craig as Lord Asriel, Lyra's strict and mysterious adventurer uncle. In July 2006, it was reported that Paul Bettany was in talks to play the role.
 Sam Elliott as Lee Scoresby, a Texan aeronaut who comes to Lyra's aid. Pullman has singled out Elliott's performance as one the film got "just right."
 Eva Green as Serafina Pekkala, a witch queen.
 Jim Carter as John Faa, the king of the Gyptians.
 Clare Higgins as Ma Costa, member of a Gyptian family that aids Lyra.
 Ben Walker as Roger Parslow, Lyra's best friend, who is kidnapped and taken north.
 Charlie Rowe as Billy Costa, son of Ma Costa, and Lyra's friend.
 Steven Loton as Tony Costa, son of Ma Costa and Billy's older brother.
 Christopher Lee as the Magisterium's first high councilor. Lee's casting was also at New Line's behest, rather than that of Chris Weitz.
 Tom Courtenay as Farder Coram, Gyptian second-in-command and advisor to John Faa.
 Derek Jacobi as the Magisterial emissary.
 Simon McBurney as Fra Pavel, a Magisterial agent.
 Jack Shepherd as master of Jordan College.
 Magda Szubanski as Mrs. Lonsdale.
 Hattie Morahan as Sister Clara.

Voice cast
 Ian McKellen as Iorek Byrnison, an armoured polar bear (panserbjørn) who becomes Lyra's friend and comrade. Nonso Anozie and Chris Hemsworth had recorded lines for the part of Iorek Byrnison, but was replaced by McKellen at a late stage as New Line wanted a bigger name in the role. New Line president of production Toby Emmerich claimed that he "never thought Anozie sounded like Iorek" and while he initially trusted director Weitz's casting decision, he "never stopped thinking that this guy didn't sound right." The recasting was against Weitz's wishes, though he later said "if you're going to have anyone recast in your movie, you're happy it's Ian McKellen."
 Freddie Highmore as Pantalaimon, Lyra's dæmon. Pan was originally to be voiced by an older actor, but they called in Highmore instead, as it would be more of an intimate relationship if Pan and Lyra were the same age, and also would underscore the contrast between Lyra's relationship with him versus her relationships with older male characters such as Lord Asriel, Lee Scoresby and Iorek.
 Ian McShane as Ragnar Sturlusson, king of the panserbjørne. Ragnar's name in the book was Iofur Raknison, but the name was changed to prevent confusion between him and Iorek. However, in the German-language version of the film, the dialogue retains the name "Iofur Raknison", whilst the subtitles reflect the change.
 Kathy Bates as Hester, Lee Scoresby's hare (jackrabbit) dæmon.
 Kristin Scott Thomas as Stelmaria, Lord Asriel's dæmon.

Production

Development

On February 11, 2002, following the success of New Line's The Lord of the Rings: The Fellowship of the Ring, the studio bought the rights to Philip Pullman's His Dark Materials trilogy. In July 2003, Tom Stoppard was commissioned to write the screenplay. Directors Brett Ratner and Sam Mendes expressed interest in the film, but a year later, Chris Weitz was hired to direct after approaching the studio with an unsolicited 40-page treatment. The studio rejected the script, asking Weitz to start from scratch. Since Weitz was an admirer of Stoppard's work, he decided not to read the adaptation in case he "subconsciously poached things from him." After delivering his script, Weitz cited Barry Lyndon and Star Wars as stylistic influences on the film. In 2004, Weitz was invited by The Lord of the Rings director Peter Jackson onto the set of King Kong (2005) in order to gather information on directing a big-budget film, and to receive advice on dealing with New Line Cinema, for whom Jackson had worked on Lord of the Rings. After a subsequent interview in which Weitz said the novel's attacks on organised religion would have to be softened, he was criticised by some fans, and on December 15, 2004, Weitz resigned as director of the trilogy, citing the enormous technical challenges of the epic. He later indicated that he had envisioned the possibility of being denounced by both the book's fans and its detractors, as well as a studio hoping for another Lord of the Rings.

On August 9, 2005, British director Anand Tucker took over from Weitz. Tucker felt the film would thematically be about Lyra "looking for a family", and Pullman agreed: "He has plenty of very good ideas, and he isn't daunted by the technical challenges. But the best thing from the point of view of all who care about the story is his awareness that it isn't about computer graphics; it isn't about fantastic adventures in amazing-looking worlds; it's about Lyra." Tucker resigned on May 8, 2006, citing creative disagreements with New Line, and Weitz returned to direct. Weitz said "I'm both the first and third director on the film … but I did a lot of growing in the interim."

According to producer Deborah Forte, Tucker wanted to make a smaller, less exciting film than New Line wanted. New Line production president Toby Emmerich said of Weitz's return: "I think Chris realised that if he didn't come back in and step up, maybe the movie wasn't going to get made … We really didn't have a Plan B at that point." Weitz was attracted back to the project after receiving a letter from Pullman asking him to reconsider. Since his departure, blueprints, production design and visual effects strategies had been put into position, and while Weitz admitted that his fears did not vanish, the project suddenly seemed feasible for the director.

Filming
Filming began at Shepperton Studios on September 4, 2006, with additional sequences shot in Switzerland and Norway. Filming also took place at the Old Royal Naval College at Greenwich, Chiswick House in London, and in Radcliffe Square, Christ Church, Oxford, Exeter College, Oxford, The Queen's College, Oxford, The Historic Dockyard Chatham and Hedsor House in Buckinghamshire.

Design
Production designer Dennis Gassner says of his work on the film:

Rhythm and Hues Studios created the main dæmons and Framestore CFC created all the bears. British company Cinesite created the secondary dæmons.

Differences from the novel
Numerous scenes from the novel did not feature in the film or were markedly changed. On December 7, 2007, New York magazine reviewed draft scripts from both Stoppard and Weitz; both were significantly longer than the final version, and Weitz's draft (which, unlike Stoppard's, did not feature significant additions to the source material) was pronounced the best of the three. The magazine concluded that instead of a "likely three hours of running time" that included such scenes as Mrs. Coulter's London party and Lyra's meeting with a witch representative, the studio had opted for a "failed" length of under 2 hours in order to maximize revenue.

On October 9, 2007, Weitz revealed that the final 3 chapters from Northern Lights had been moved to the film's potential sequel, The Subtle Knife, in order to provide "the most promising conclusion to the first film and the best possible beginning to the second," though he also said less than a month later that there had been "tremendous marketing pressure" to create "an upbeat ending." (The San Francisco Chronicle found this "truncated" ending abrupt.) Author Pullman publicly supported these changes, saying that "every film has to make changes to the story that the original book tells—not to change the outcome, but to make it fit the dimensions and the medium of film." In addition to removing the novel's unsettling ending, the film reverses the order in which Lyra travels to Bolvangar, the Gobbler's outpost, and then Svalbard, the armoured bears' kingdom. (Neither deviation from the book features in Scholastic Publishing's The Golden Compass: The Story of the Movie novelisation.) In July 2009, Weitz told a Comic Con audience that the film had been "recut by [New Line], and my experience with it ended being quite a terrible one"; he also told Time magazine that he had felt that by "being faithful to the book I was working at odds with the studio."

Tasha Robinson of The A.V. Club argued that through the use of a spoken introduction and other exposition-filled dialogue, the film fails by "baldly revealing up front everything that the novel is trying to get you to wonder about and to explore slowly." Youyoung Lee wrote in a December 2007 Entertainment Weekly that the film "leaves out the gore", such as the book's ritualistic heart-eating that concludes the bear fight, "to create family-friendlier fare." Lee also said that the film "downplays the Magisterium's religious nature", but Robinson argued that the depiction of the church in the film is as "a hierarchical organisation of formally robed, iconography-heavy priests who dictate and define morality for their followers, are based out of cathedrals, and decry teachings counter to theirs as 'heresy.' ... doing ugly things to children under cover of secrecy." Robinson then asks, "Who are most people going to think of besides the Catholic Church?"

Although the character of Mrs. Coulter has black hair in the novel, Pullman responded to the blonde Kidman's portrayal by saying, "I was clearly wrong. You sometimes are wrong about your characters. She's blonde. She has to be."

Controversies
Several key themes of the novels, such as the rejection of religion and the abuse of power in a fictionalised version of the Church, were diluted in the adaptation. Director Weitz said that "in the books the Magisterium is a version of the Catholic Church gone wildly astray from its roots", but that the organisation portrayed in his film would not directly match that of Pullman's books. Instead, the Magisterium represents all dogmatic organisations.

Attempting to reassure fans of the novels, Weitz said that religion would instead appear in euphemistic terms, yet the decision was criticised by some fans, anti-censorship groups, and the National Secular Society (of which Pullman is an honorary associate), which said "they are taking the heart out of it, losing the point of it, castrating it ..." and "this is part of a long-term problem over freedom of speech." The Atlantic wrote: "With $180 million at stake, the studio opted to kidnap the book's body and leave behind its soul." The changes from the novel have been present since Tom Stoppard's rejected version of the script, and Pullman expected the film to be "faithful", although he also said: "They do know where to put the theology and that's off the film." A Christianity Today review of the film noted that "'Magisterium' does refer, in the real world, to the teaching authority of the Catholic Church, and the film [is] peppered with religiously significant words like 'oblation' and 'heresy'", adding that when one character smashes through the wall of a Magisterium building, the damaged exterior is "decorated with [Christian] Byzantine icons."

On October 7, 2007, the Catholic League called for a boycott of the film. League president William A. Donohue said he would not ordinarily object to the film, but that while the religious elements are diluted from the source material, the film will encourage children to read the novels, which he says denigrate Christianity and promote atheism for children. He cited Pullman telling The Washington Post in 2001 that he is trying to undermine the basis of Christian belief. The league hoped that "the film [would fail] to meet box-office expectations and that [Pullman's] books attract few buyers", declaring the boycott campaign a success after a North American opening weekend which was lower than anticipated.

Albert Mohler, the president of the Southern Baptist Theological Seminary, agreed that the broad appeal of the film was a dangerous lure to the novels, which he criticised for carrying a clear agenda to expose what Pullman believes is the "tyranny of the Christian faith" and for providing "a liberating mythology for a new secular age." Denny Wayman of the Free Methodist Church made the assertion that The Golden Compass is a "film trying to preach an atheistic message." Other evangelical groups, such as the Christian Film and Television Commission, adopted a "wait-and-see" approach to the film before deciding upon any action, as did the Catholic Church in England and Wales. Theologian Donna Freitas argued that the books were "deeply theological, and deeply Christian in their theology". In November 2007, a review of the film by the director and staff reviewer of the Office for Film and Broadcasting of the United States Conference of Catholic Bishops (USCCB) appeared on the website of the Catholic News Service and in Catholic newspapers across the country. The review suggested that instead of a boycott, it may be appropriate for Catholic parents to "talk through any thorny philosophical issues" with their children. However, on December 10, 2007 the review was removed from the website at the USCCB's request. On December 19, 2007, the Vatican newspaper, L'Osservatore Romano, published an editorial in which it denounced the film as godless.

Pullman said of Donohue's call for a boycott, "Why don't we trust readers? Why don't we trust filmgoers? Oh, it causes me to shake my head with sorrow that such nitwits could be loose in the world." In a discussion with Donohue on CBS's Early Show, Ellen Johnson, president of American Atheists, said that rather than promote atheism, the film would encourage children to question authority, saying that would not be a bad thing for children to learn. Director Weitz says that he believes His Dark Materials is "not an atheistic work, but a highly spiritual and reverent piece of writing", and Nicole Kidman defended her decision to star in the film, saying that the source material had been "watered down a little" and that her religious beliefs would prevent her from taking a role in a film she perceived as anti-Catholic. Some commentators indicated that they believed both sides' criticism would prove ultimately impotent and that the negative publicity would prove a boon for the film's box-office. Sales were in fact poor; one week after the film's release, Roger Ebert said of the Catholic campaign, "any bad buzz on a family film can be mortal, and that seems to have been the case this time." The planned film trilogy has not been continued, prompting actor Sam Elliott to blame censorship and the Catholic Church.

Release

Theatrical
The film premiered in London on November 27, 2007, and was released on December 5, 2007, in British cinemas by Entertainment Film Distributors and released on December 7, 2007, in American cinemas by New Line Cinema.

Home media
The film was released on DVD and Blu-ray formats in the United Kingdom on April 28, 2008, and the United States on April 29, 2008.  The extra material on the single-disc DVD consists of previews of upcoming New Line Cinema films. The two-disc edition includes a commentary from writer/director Chris Weitz, eleven "making-of" featurettes, a photo gallery, and theatrical and teaser trailers. The Blu-ray Disc features the same extras from the two-disc DVD edition.

Shortly before the film's release, Weitz suggested that an extended cut of the film could be released on DVD, saying "I'd really love to do a fuller cut of the film"; he further speculated that such a version "could probably end up at two-and-a-half hours." This proposed cut would presumably not include the original ending: MTV reported in December 2007 that Weitz hoped to include that material at the beginning of a possible The Subtle Knife adaptation, and that a Compass Director's Cut might feature "a moment" of it as a "teaser." so far, however, no extended version has been released, as of 2014.

On June 9, 2020 Weitz revealed on Twitter that it would take $17 million for him to complete VFX for his directors cut making him think there is no financial incentive for them to finish it and release it .

Reception

Box-office
The North American opening weekend return was "a little disappointing" for New Line Cinema, earning US$25.8 million with total domestic box-office of $70 million compared to an estimated $180 million production budget. Despite this, the film's fortunes rebounded as its performance outside the United States was described as "stellar" by Variety, and as "astonishing" by New Line. In the United Kingdom, the film grossed $53,198,635 and became the second-highest-grossing non-sequel of 2007 there (behind The Simpsons Movie). In Japan, the film was officially released in March 2008 on 700 screens, ultimately grossing $33,501,399; but previews of the film between February 23–24, 2008, earned $2.5 million. By July 6, 2008, it had earned $302,127,136 internationally, totaling $372,234,864 worldwide. Overseas rights to the film were sold to fund the $180 million production budget for the film, so most of these profits did not go to New Line. This has been cited as a possible "last straw" in Warner Bros. Discovery's (formerly Time Warner) decision to merge New Line Cinema into Warner Bros. Pictures.

Critical response

Reviews of The Golden Compass were mixed. On the review aggregator website Rotten Tomatoes, the film has an approval rating of 43%, based on 197 reviews, with an average score of 5.60/10. The critical consensus reads: "Without the bite or the controversy of the source material, The Golden Compass is reduced to impressive visuals overcompensating for lax storytelling." At Metacritic, which assigns a weighted average rating out of 100 to reviews from mainstream critics, the film has received an average score of 51, based on 33 reviews, indicating "mixed or average reviews". Audiences polled by CinemaScore gave the film an average grade of "B" on an A+ to F scale.

Manohla Dargis of The New York Times said that the film "crams so many events, characters, ... twists and turns, sumptuously appointed rooms and ethereally strange vistas ... that [it] risks losing you in the whirl" and that while The Golden Compass is "an honorable work," it is "hampered by its fealty to the book and its madly rushed pace." James Berardinelli of ReelReviews gave the film 2.5 stars out of 4, calling it "adequate, but not inspired" and criticising the first hour for its rushed pace and sketchily-developed characters. James Christopher of The Times of London was disappointed, praising the "marvellous" special effects and casting, but saying that the "books weave a magic the film simply cannot match" and citing a "lack of genuine drama."

Time rated it an "A−" and called it a "good, if familiar fantasy," saying "The find is Dakota Blue Richards ... who's both grounded and magical." Peter Bradshaw of The Guardian rated it 4 stars out of 5, praising Nicole Kidman's casting and saying it had "no other challengers as [2007's] big Christmas movie." Leonard Maltin gave the film 3 out of 4 stars, and said that "Richards is persuasive" and that it "does a good job of introducing us to an unfamiliar world." Critic Roger Ebert awarded the film 4 out of 4 stars and called it "a darker, deeper fantasy epic than the 'Rings' trilogy, 'The Chronicles of Narnia' or the 'Potter' films," saying that it "creates villains that are more complex and poses more intriguing questions. As a visual experience, it is superb. As an escapist fantasy, it is challenging ... I think [it] is a wonderfully good-looking movie, with exciting passages and a captivating heroine."

Pullman himself was described by a London Times interviewer as sounding "ambivalent" and "guarded" about the film, saying in March 2008: "A lot of things about it were good… Nothing's perfect. Nothing can bring out all that's in the book. There are always compromises." He hoped, however, that the rest of the trilogy would be adapted with the same cast and crew. In July 2009, after this possibility had been exhausted, Weitz told Time magazine that he thought the film's special effects ended up being its "most successful element."

Debbie Day of Premiere magazine said "The Golden Compass ultimately fails as a film in its broad strokes and inadequate scene development."

Accolades

The Golden Compass won the 2008 Oscar for Best Visual Effects and the BAFTA Film Award for Special Visual Effects notably beating what many considered to be the front-runner, Michael Bay's Transformers, which had swept the VES awards prior. It was also nominated for 2 Critics' Choice Awards in 2007 ("Best Family Film," and "Best Young Actress" for Dakota Blue Richards), 5 Satellite Awards and the Hugo Award for Best Dramatic Presentation, Long Form. The Golden Compass was nominated for the National Movie Award for Best Family Film, but lost to Disney/Pixar's WALL-E.

Music

French composer Alexandre Desplat composed the film's music. British singer Kate Bush wrote and performed the song "Lyra" which is played over the end credits. The film's soundtrack album was released on January 22, 2008, by WaterTower Music.

Video game

The video game for this film was released in November 2007 in Europe and December 2007 in North America and Australia for the PC, Wii, PlayStation 2, PlayStation 3, PlayStation Portable, Nintendo DS and the Xbox 360. It was developed by Shiny Entertainment and published by Sega.

Players take control of the characters Lyra Belacqua and Iorek Byrnison in Lyra's attempt to save her friend Roger from the General Oblation Board. As this game does not fully take into account the changes made by the final version of the film, a small amount of footage from the film's deleted ending can be viewed near the end of the game, and the order in which Lyra travels to Bolvangar and Svalbard follows the book and not the film.

Future

Cancelled sequels
At the time of The Golden Compasss theatrical release, Chris Weitz pledged to "protect [the] integrity" of the prospective sequels by being "much less compromising" in the book-to-film adaptation process. New Line Cinema commissioned Hossein Amini to write a screenplay based on the second book in the trilogy, The Subtle Knife, potentially for release in May 2010, with the third book of the trilogy, The Amber Spyglass, to follow. However, New Line president Toby Emmerich stressed that production of the second and third films was dependent on the financial success of The Golden Compass. When The Golden Compass did not meet expectations at the United States box-office, the likelihood of a sequel was downplayed by New Line. According to studio co-head Michael Lynne, "The jury is still very much out on the movie, and while it's performed very strongly overseas, we'll look at it early 2008 and see where we're going with a sequel."

In February 2008, Weitz told The Daily Yomiuri, a Japanese newspaper, that he still hoped for the sequels' production: "at first it looked like we were down for the count because in the U.S. [the film] underperformed, but then internationally it performed [better] than expectations. So, a lot depends on Japan, frankly… I think if it does well enough here we'll be in good shape for that." Although producer Deborah Forte had, in March 2008, expressed optimism that the sequels would be made, by October 2008, the two planned sequels were officially placed on hold, according to New Line Cinema, because of financial concerns during the global recession. Sam Elliott, however, stated, "The Catholic Church ... lambasted them, and I think it scared New Line off."

Television reboot
In 2019, 12 years after the film's disappointment that caused the two sequels to be scrapped, a television adaptation of His Dark Materials was made. It is produced by Bad Wolf and New Line Production and was shown on both BBC One and HBO. It received a much better reception than the film adaptation.

References

External links
 
 
 
 
 
 Book Vs. Film: The Golden Compass by The A.V. Club
 The Golden Compass Production Notes

2000s fantasy adventure films
2007 films
American epic films
American fantasy adventure films
BAFTA winners (films)
British epic films
British fantasy adventure films
Catholicism in fiction
Religious controversies in film
Christianity in popular culture controversies
Films about orphans
Films about parallel universes
Films about polar bears
Films about secret societies
Films about witchcraft
Films based on British novels
Films based on children's books
Films based on fantasy novels
Films directed by Chris Weitz
Films scored by Alexandre Desplat
Films shot at Shepperton Studios
Films shot in London
Films shot in Norway
Films shot in Oxfordshire
Films that won the Best Visual Effects Academy Award
Films using motion capture
Films with screenplays by Chris Weitz
Films shot in Switzerland
High fantasy films
His Dark Materials
New Line Cinema films
Steampunk films
2000s English-language films
2000s American films
2000s British films